Chieh Yuan (15 March 1945 – 16 November 1977) was an actor and martial artist. He was an actor for Shaw Brothers and in 1972, he was cast in Bruce Lee's The Game of Death. Chieh died in 1977 from cerebral edema, the same cause to Bruce Lee's death, and at age 32, the same age at which Bruce Lee had died.

See also
 Cinema of Hong Kong
 Game of Death
 Shaw Bros.

External links
 
 Gai Yuen at the Hong Kong Movie Database

1945 births
1977 deaths
Hong Kong male film actors
Malaysian male film actors
Malaysian martial artists
People from Kluang
20th-century Hong Kong male actors
Neurological disease deaths in Hong Kong
Deaths from cerebral edema
Malaysian people of Chinese descent
Malaysian emigrants to Hong Kong
Malaysian born Hong Kong artists